Evelyn Mary Jamison (24 February 1877 – 9 May 1972) was a British medievalist who devoted herself mainly to the study of the history of the Normans in Sicily. She was vice-principal and tutor of Lady Margaret Hall, Oxford from 1921 to 1937.

Life
Jamison was born in 1877, the eldest of three children of Arthur Andrew Jamison, a doctor, and his wife Isabella Green (whose mother, Mary Brandreth Green, was a friend of the novelist Elizabeth Gaskell).

Evelyn Jamison attended Francis Holland School, 39 Graham Street (now Graham Terrace) in London between 1890 and 1895, from where she gained a place at Oxford to study modern History.  Her recollections of her time at Francis Holland can be read in Graham Street Memories (ed. B Dunning 1931), where she recalls December exams being sat under the "flare of unshaded gaslights when the yellow fog of tradition descended on London".

After studying art in Paris, she entered Lady Margaret Hall in 1898 to study Modern History. Graduating in 1901, she was made a research fellow at Somerville College in 1903, and the first beneficiary of the Lady Margaret Research Fellowship, established the previous year by Principal Agnes Maitland. This enabled her to travel to Italy, studying at the British School at Rome. In 1907 she returned to Lady Margaret Hall, initially as librarian and bursar, and subsequently as assistant history tutor. From 1921 to 1937 she was history tutor and vice-principal of Lady Margaret, and from 1928 to 1935 University Lecturer in History. Among her students was the historian Marjorie Chibnall. She authored several works of history, which were notable for including previously unpublished archival material from the Norman Kingdom of Sicily. Her final work, an edition of the Catalogus Baronum, was completed after her death by Errico Cuozzo.

After Jamison's death, several of her friends dedicated in her memory a new stone effigy of Lady Margaret Beaufort, namesake of Lady Margaret Hall, installed in the college chapel to replace an earlier, and by then deteriorated, plaster one.

Works
  The Norman Administration of Apulia and Capua, more Especially under Roger II and William I, 1127-1166 ', in: Papers of the British School at Rome 6 (1913) 211- 481; Reprint of the Edition 1913, edited by Dione Clementi and Theo Kölzer, Aalen 1987 
 Studies on the History of Medieval Sicily and South Italy, edited by Dione Clementi. Aalen 1992 
 Admiral Eugenius of Sicily, His Life and Work and the Authorship of the Epistola ad Petrum and the Historia Hugonis Falcandi Siculi, London 1957 
 Judex Tarentinus. Aalen 1992 
 Catalogus Baronum'', Rom 1972 (Fonti per la storia d'Italia ; 101)

References

1877 births
1972 deaths
Alumni of Lady Margaret Hall, Oxford
British medievalists
British women historians
English historians
Fellows of Lady Margaret Hall, Oxford
Fellows of Somerville College, Oxford
First women admitted to degrees at Oxford
People from Oxford